Sri Lanka Ranajana Dr Sarath Gunapala (Sinhala:සරත් ගුණපාල) is a solid-state physicist, senior research scientist and group supervisor at NASA's Jet Propulsion Laboratory. He works primarily in Quantum Well Infrared Photo Detecting. He is also a board member of Quantum Well Infrared Photodetector Technologies LLC. Gunapala lives in the suburbs of Los Angeles. He was born in Sri Lanka.

After receiving his education from Nalanda College, Colombo, Gunapala graduated from University of Colombo and University of Pittsburgh.

Gunapala was presented with Nalanda Keerthi Sri award in 2006 by his alma mater Nalanda College, Colombo.

References 

 National Honours – 2017 held under President’s patronage
 National Honours – 2017
 PRESIDENT AT NATIONAL HONOURS-2017 CEREMONY
 National Honours after 12 years
  Interview With Dr.Sarath Gunapala

Living people
Alumni of Nalanda College, Colombo
Sinhalese engineers
Sri Lanka Ranajana
Year of birth missing (living people)